Charles Aldridge (born 12 May 1947) is a New Zealand cricketer. He played in four first-class matches for Canterbury in 1973/74, and in three List A matches for Northern Districts from 1977 to 1979.

References

External links
 

1947 births
Living people
New Zealand cricketers
Canterbury cricketers
Northern Districts cricketers
Sportspeople from Balclutha, New Zealand